Macerio is a genus of araneomorph spiders in the family Cheiracanthiidae, first described by Eugène Simon in 1897.

Species
 it contains eight species:
Macerio chabon Ramírez, 1997 — Chile
Macerio conguillio Ramírez, 1997 — Chile, Argentina
Macerio flavus (Nicolet, 1849) — Chile, Argentina
Macerio lanin Bonaldo & Brescovit, 1997 — Chile, Argentina
Macerio nicoleti (Mello-Leitão, 1951) — Chile
Macerio nublio Bonaldo & Brescovit, 1997 — Chile
Macerio pichono Bonaldo & Brescovit, 1997 — Chile
Macerio pucalan Ramírez, 1997 — Chile

References

External links

Araneomorphae genera
Cheiracanthiidae